Jump King is a 2019 platforming video game developed by Nexile. Jump King was released on Steam for Microsoft Windows on May 3, 2019. It was released for PlayStation 4, Nintendo Switch, and Xbox One on June 9, 2020. In the game, players must ascend a vertical map and avoid falling down by making careful jumps. Multiple free expansions for the game have been released since its launch.

The game received viral attention due to its difficulty and has been featured in Twitch live streams.

Gameplay
The player controls a king who can move by either jumping or walking, and must reach the top of an extremely tall tower to beat the game. Jumps can be charged, which affects how far the player moves each time they perform a jump. The game encourages players to experiment and features multiple routes to reach the top of the tower and beat the game. Additionally, at the top of the tower, there is a "smoking hot babe", teased through dialogue at the beginning of the game.

In addition to the main game, there are two additional maps titled "New Babe+" and "Ghost of the Babe".

The game's soundtrack has a total of 33 different songs, which belong to different areas. As the player progresses further up the map, these songs accompany the location they are currently in.

The game's difficulty and style of gameplay has been compared to Getting Over It with Bennett Foddy.

Plot
There is a "smoking hot babe" at the top, and Jump King wants to reach her. To reach her, he must jump up a series of platforms.

Reception
The game received mostly positive attention. Oliver Roderick of Switch Player noted the game's intentional difficulty, but described it as "truly solid". Similarly, Andrew Shaw of The Digital Fix praised the game's difficulty, soundtrack, and "beautifully pared-down but still vibrant and evocative 16-bit art style and equally retro sound effects." Other reviewers were critical of the game's difficulty, with Paul Collett of Finger Guns feeling that the game's challenge was "left to chance and [not] to player skill," despite the game not having any luck elements whatsoever.

See also
Getting Over It with Bennett Foddy

References

External links

2019 video games
Action video games
Indie video games
King characters in video games
Nintendo Switch games
Platform games
PlayStation 4 games
Retro-style video games
Video games developed in Sweden
Windows games
Xbox One games